Schnitzer is a German noun meaning "carver" and is the surname of:

 Eduard Schnitzer (1840–1892), physician, naturalist and governor of the Egyptian province of Equatoria on the upper Nile
 Florian Schnitzer (born 1981), German ice hockey player
Friedrich Ferdinand Schnitzer, 19th-century Bavarian-American architect
Germaine Schnitzer (1888–1982), French pianist based in America
Sam Schnitzer, Russian-Jewish immigrant to America, founder of Schnitzer Steel Industries, Inc., American steel manufacturing company.
 Harold Schnitzer (1923–2011), American businessman and philanthropist, son of Sam Schnitzer
 Arlene Schnitzer, American art collector, wife of Harold Schnitzer, major donor to Arlene Schnitzer Concert Hall in Portland, Oregon
 Jordan Schnitzer, American businessman and philanthropist, son of Harold and Arlene Schnitzer, major donor to Jordan Schnitzer Museum of Art
 Herbert Schnitzer, German, owner and co-founder of Schnitzer Motorsport
 Josef Schnitzer, German racedriver and co-founder of Schnitzer Motorsport
 Joseph Schnitzer (1859 in Lauingen – 1939 in Munich ), a theologian
 Robert C. Schnitzer (1906–2008), an American actor, producer, educator, and theater administrator
 Werner Schnitzer (born 1942), German television actor

Schnitzer may also refer to:
 AC Schnitzer, the BMW tuning specialist department of Schnitzer Motorsport based in Aachen
 Schnitzer Motorsport, Germany-based BMW Motorsport Team that races in World Touring Car Championship

See also 
 Schnitzler
 Schnitzel
 Snitzer

German-language surnames
Occupational surnames